January is the first month of the year in the Julian and Gregorian calendars and is also the first of seven months to have a length of 31 days. The first day of the month is known as New Year's Day. It is, on average, the coldest month of the year within most of the Northern Hemisphere (where it is the second month of winter) and the warmest month of the year within most of the Southern Hemisphere (where it is the second month of summer). In the Southern hemisphere, January is the seasonal equivalent of July in the Northern hemisphere and vice versa.

Ancient Roman observances during this month include Cervula and Juvenalia, celebrated January 1, as well as one of three Agonalia, celebrated January 9, and Carmentalia, celebrated January 11. These dates do not correspond to the modern Gregorian calendar.

History 

January (in Latin, Ianuarius) is named after Janus, the god of beginnings and transitions in Roman mythology.

Traditionally, the original Roman calendar consisted of 10 months totaling 304 days, winter being considered a month-less period. Around 713 BC, the semi-mythical successor of Romulus, King Numa Pompilius, is supposed to have added the months of January and February, so that the calendar covered a standard lunar year (354 days). Although March was originally the first month in the old Roman calendar, January became the first month of the calendar year either under Numa or under the Decemvirs about 450 BC (Roman writers differ). In contrast, each specific calendar year was identified by the names of the two consuls, who entered office on March 15 until 153 BC, at which point they started entering office on January 1.

Various Christian feast dates were used for the New Year in Europe during the Middle Ages, including March 25 (Feast of the Annunciation) and December 25. However, medieval calendars were still displayed in the Roman fashion with twelve columns from January to December. Beginning in the 16th century, European countries began officially making January 1 the start of the New Year once again—sometimes called Circumcision Style because this was the date of the Feast of the Circumcision, being the seventh day after December 25.

Historical names for January include its original Roman designation, Ianuarius, the Saxon term Wulf-monath (meaning "wolf month") and Charlemagne's designation Wintarmanoth ("winter / cold month"). In Slovene, it is traditionally called prosinec. The name, associated with millet bread and the act of asking for something, was first written in 1466 in the Škofja Loka manuscript.

According to Theodor Mommsen, 1 January became the first day of the year in 600 AUC of the Roman calendar (153 BC), due to disasters in the Lusitanian War. A Lusitanian chief called Punicus invaded the Roman territory, defeated two Roman governors, and killed their troops. The Romans resolved to send a consul to Hispania, and in order to accelerate the dispatch of aid, "they even made the new consuls enter into office two months and a half before the legal time" (March 15).

January symbols 

 January's birthstone is the garnet, which represents constancy.
 Its birth flower is the cottage pink Dianthus caryophyllus or galanthus as well as the traditional carnation.
 The Japanese floral emblem of January is the camellia (Camellia sinensis).
 In Finnish, the month of tammikuu means the heart of the winter and because the name literally means "oak moon", it can be inferred that the oak tree is the heart of the grand forest with many valuable trees as opposed to the typical Arctic forests, which are typically pine and spruce. The photograph of a large tree covered with ice against a blue sky is a familiar scene during Finland's winter.
 The zodiac signs for the month of January are Capricorn (until January 19) and Aquarius (January 20 onwards).
 The name of the full moon occurring in January is the wolf moon.

January observances 
This list does not necessarily imply either official status or general observance.

Month-long observances 

 Alzheimer's Awareness Month (Canada)
 Dry January (United Kingdom)
 National Codependency Awareness Month  (United States)
 National Mentoring Month (United States)
 National Healthy Weight Awareness Month  (United States)
 Slavery and Human Trafficking Prevention Month (United States)
 Stalking Awareness Month  (United States)
 Veganuary

Food months in the United States 
This list does not necessarily imply either official status or general observance.
 Be Kind to Food Servers Month (by proclamation, State of Tennessee)
 California Dried Plum Digestive Health Month
 Hot Tea Month
 National Soup Month
 Oatmeal Month

Non-Gregorian observances, 2021 dates 
All Baha'i, Islamic, and Jewish observances begin at sundown prior to the date listed, and end at sundown on the date in question.
 List of observances set by the Bahá'í calendar
 List of observances set by the Chinese calendar
 List of observances set by the Hebrew calendar
 List of observances set by the Islamic calendar
 List of observances set by the Solar Hijri calendar

Moveable observances 
This list does not necessarily imply either official status or general observance.
 See: List of movable Western Christian observances
 See: List of movable Eastern Christian observances
January 2 unless that day is a Sunday, in which case January 3: January 2 
 New Year Holiday (Scotland)
First Friday
 Children's Day (Bahamas)
Second Saturday
 Children's Day (Thailand)
Second Monday
 Birthday of Eugenio María de Hostos (Puerto Rico, United States)
 Coming of Age Day (Japan)
Friday before third Monday
 Lee–Jackson Day (Virginia, United States, defunct)
Third Friday
 International Fetish Day
Sunday closest to January 22
 National Sanctity of Human Life Day (United States)
Third full week of January
 Hunt for Happiness Week (International observance)
 National Non-Smoking Week (Canada)
Last full week of January
 National School Choice Week (United States)
Third Monday
 Martin Luther King, Jr. Day (United States)
 Idaho Human Rights Day (Idaho, United States)
Wednesday of the third full week of January
 Weedless Wednesday (Canada)
Friday between January 19–25
 Husband's Day (Iceland)
Last Saturday
 National Seed Swap Day (United States)
Last Sunday
 Liberation of Auschwitz Memorial Day (Netherlands)
January 30 or the nearest Sunday
 World Leprosy Day
Last Monday in January
 Bubble Wrap Appreciation Day
Fourth Monday
 Community Manager Appreciation Day (International observance)
 National Heroes' Day (Cayman Islands)
Monday Closest to January 29
 Auckland Anniversary Day

Fixed observances 
 December 25 – January 5: Twelve Days of Christmas (Western Christianity)
 December 26 – January 1: Kwanzaa (African Americans)
 December 31 – January 1, in some cases until January 2: Hogmanay (Scotland)
 January 1
 Feast of the Circumcision of Christ
 Feast of the Holy Name of Jesus (Anglican Communion, Lutheran Church)
 Feast of Fools (Medieval Europe)
 Constitution Day (Italy)
 Dissolution of Czechoslovakia-related observances:
 Day of the Establishment of the Slovak Republic (Slovakia)
 Restoration Day of the Independent Czech State (Czech Republic)
 Euro Day (European Union)
 Flag Day (Lithuania)
 Founding Day (Taiwan)
 Global Family Day
 Independence Day (Brunei, Cameroon, Haiti, Sudan)
 International Nepali Dhoti and Nepali Topi Day
 Jump-up Day (Montserrat, British Overseas Territories)
 Kalpataru Day (Ramakrishna Movement)
 National Bloody Mary Day (United States)
 National Tree Planting Day (Tanzania)
 New Year's Day
 Japanese New Year
 Novy God Day (Russia)
 Sjoogwachi (Okinawa Islands)
 Polar Bear Swim Day (Canada and United States)
 Public Domain Day (multiple countries)
 Solemnity of Mary, Mother of God (Catholic Church)
 World Day of Peace
 Triumph of the Revolution (Cuba)
 January 2
 Ancestry Day (Haiti)
 Berchtold's Day (Liechtenstein, Switzerland, and the Alsace)
 Carnival Day (Saint Kitts and Nevis)
 Happy Mew Year For Cats Day (Thomas Roy)
 Kakizome (Japan)
 National Creampuff Day (United States)
 National Science Fiction Day (United States)
 The second day of New Year (a holiday in Armenia, Kazakhstan, North Macedonia, Mauritius, Montenegro, New Zealand, Romania, Russia, Switzerland, and Ukraine)
 Nyinlong (Bhutan)
 Victory of Armed Forces Day (Cuba)
 January 3
 Anniversary of the 1966 Coup d’état (Burkina Faso)
 Memento Mori (Thomas Roy)
 Nakhatsenendyan toner (Armenia): January 3–5
 Ministry of Religious Affairs Day (Indonesia)
 National Chocolate Covered Cherry Day (United States)
 Tamaseseri Festival (Hakozaki Shrine, Fukuoka, Japan)
 January 4
 Day of the Fallen against the Colonial Repression (Angola)
 Day of the Martyrs (Democratic Republic of the Congo)
 Dimpled Chad Day (Thomas Roy)
 Hwinukan mukee (Okinawa Islands, Japan)
 Independence Day (Myanmar)
 Ogoni Day (Movement for the Survival of the Ogoni People)
 World Braille Day
 January 5
 National Bird Day (United States)
 National Whipped Cream Day (United States)
 Sausage Day (United Kingdom)
 Strawberry day (Japan)
 Take Our Daughters and Sons to Work Day (Sydney, Melbourne, and Brisbane, Australia)
 Tucindan (Serbia, Montenegro)
 January 6
 Armed Forces Day (Iraq)
 Epiphany or Three Kings' Day (Western Christianity) or Theophany (Eastern Christianity), and its related observances:
 Befana Day (Italy)
 Christmas (Armenian Apostolic Church)
 Christmas Eve (Russia)
 Christmas Eve (Ukraine)
 Christmas Eve (Bosnia and Herzegovina)
 Christmas Eve (North Macedonia)
 Little Christmas (Ireland)
 Þrettándinn (Iceland)
 Three Wise Men Day
 Pathet Lao Day (Laos)
 January 7
 Christmas (Eastern Orthodox Churches and Oriental Orthodox Churches using the Julian Calendar, Rastafari)
 Christmas in Russia
 Christmas in Ukraine
 Christmas (Bosnia and Herzegovina)
 Remembrance Day of the Dead (Armenia)
 Distaff Day (Medieval Europe)
 Nanakusa no sekku (Japan)
 Pioneer's Day (Liberia)
 Tricolour day (Italy)
 Victory from Genocide Day (Cambodia)
 January 8
 Show and Tell Day at Work (Thomas Roy)
 The Eighth (United States) (defunct observance)
 Typing Day (international observance)
 January 9
 Start of Hōonkō (Nishi Honganji) January 9–16 (Jōdo Shinshū Buddhism)
 Martyrs' Day (Panama)
 National Cassoulet Day (United States)
 Non-Resident Indian Day (India)
 Republic Day (Republika Srpska) (defunct, declared unconstitutional by the Constitutional Court of Bosnia and Herzegovina)
 St. Stephen's Day (Eastern Orthodox)
 January 10
 Fête du Vodoun (Benin)
 Majority Rule Day (Bahamas)
 January 11
 Children's Day (Tunisia)
 Eugenio María de Hostos Day (Puerto Rico)
 German Apples Day (Germany)
 Independence Manifesto Day (Morocco)
 Kagami biraki (Japan)
 National Human Trafficking Awareness Day (United States)
 Republic Day (Albania)
 January 12
 Memorial Day (Turkmenistan)
 Prosecutor General's Day (Russia)
 National Youth Day (India)
 Zanzibar Revolution Day (Tanzania)
 January 13
 Constitution Day (Mongolia)
 Democracy Day (Cape Verde)
 Liberation Day (Togo)
 Old New Year's Eve (Russia, Belarus, Ukraine, Serbia, Montenegro, Republic of Srpska, North Macedonia), and its related observances:
 Malanka (Ukraine, Russia, Belarus)
 St. Knut's Day (Sweden and Finland)
 Stephen Foster Memorial Day (United States)
 January 14
 Azhyrnykhua (Abkhazia)
 Day of Defenders of the Motherland (Uzbekistan)
 Feast of Divina Pastora (Barquisimeto)
 Feast of the Ass (Medieval Christianity)
 Flag Day (Georgia)
 National Forest Conservation Day (Thailand)
 Ratification Day (United States)
 Revolution and Youth Day (Tunisia)
 Yennayer (Berbers)
 January 15
 Arbor Day (Egypt)
 Armed Forces Day (Nigeria)
 Indian Army Day (India)
 John Chilembwe Day (Malawi)
 Korean Alphabet Day (North Korea)
 Sagichō at Tsurugaoka Hachimangū (Kamakura, Japan)
 Teacher's Day (Venezuela)
 Wikipedia Day (international observance)
 January 16
 National Nothing Day (Thomas Roy)
 National Religious Freedom Day (United States)
 Solemnity of Mary, Mother of God (Coptic Church)
 Teacher's Day (Myanmar)
 Teachers' Day (Thailand)
 Zuuruku Nichi (Okinawa Islands, Japan)
 Thiruvalluvar Day (Tamil Nadu, India)
 January 17
 Hardware Freedom Day (international observance)
 Judgement Day
 National Day (Menorca)
 The opening ceremony of Patras Carnival, celebrated until Clean Monday (Patras)
 January 18
 Revolution and Youth Day (Tunisia)
 Royal Thai Armed Forces Day (Thailand)
 Week of Prayer for Christian Unity (January 18–25) (Christianity)
 January 19
 Confederate Heroes Day (Texas), and its related observance:
 Robert E. Lee Day (Alabama, Arkansas, Florida, Georgia and Mississippi)
 Lee–Jackson–King Day (Virginia, United States, defunct)
 Husband's Day (Iceland)
 Kokborok Day (Tripura, India)
 National Popcorn Day (United States)
 Theophany / Epiphany (Eastern and Oriental Orthodoxy), and its related observances:
 Timkat, (on 20th during Leap Year) (Ethiopian Orthodox)
 Vodici or Baptism of Jesus (North Macedonia)
 January 20
 Armed Forces Day (Mali)
 Cheese Day (United States)
 Heroes' Day (Cape Verde)
 Inauguration Day, held every four years in odd-numbered years, except when January 20 falls on a Sunday (United States)
 Martyrs' Day (Azerbaijan)
 January 21
 Babinden (Bulgaria, Serbia)
 Birthday of Princess Ingrid Alexandra (Norway)
 Errol Barrow Day (Barbados)
 Flag Day (Quebec)
 Grandmother's Day (Poland)
 Lady of Altagracia Day (Dominican Republic)
 Lincoln Alexander Day (Canada)
 National Hug Day (United States)
 January 22
 Answer Your Cat's Question Day
 Day of Unity of Ukraine (Ukraine)
 Grandfather's Day (Poland)
 National Hot Sauce Day (United States)
 January 23
 Bounty Day (Pitcairn Island)
 Espousals of the Blessed Virgin Mary (Roman Catholic Church)
 National Pie Day (United States)
 Netaji Subhas Chandra Bose's Jayanti (Orissa, Tripura, and West Bengal, India)
 Snow Plow Mailbox Hockey Day
 World Freedom Day (Taiwan and South Korea)
 January 24
 Feast of Our Lady of Peace (Roman Catholic Church), and its related observances:
 Feria de Alasitas (La Paz)
 Moebius Syndrome Awareness Day (international observance)
 National Peanut Butter Day (United States)
 Unification Day (Romania)
 January 25
 2011 Revolution Day (Egypt)
 A Room of One's Own Day
 Burns night (Scotland, Scottish community)
 Dydd Santes Dwynwen (Wales)
 Feast of the Conversion of Saint Paul (Eastern Orthodox, Oriental Orthodox, Roman Catholic, Anglican and Lutheran churches, which concludes the Week of Prayer for Christian Unity)
 National Police Day (Egypt)
 National Voters' Day (India)
 Tatiana Day (Russia, Eastern Orthodox)
 January 26
 Australia Day (Australia)
 Duarte Day (Dominican Republic)
 Engineer's Day (Panama)
 International Customs Day
 Liberation Day (Uganda)
 Republic Day (India)
 January 27
 Day of the lifting of the siege of Leningrad (Russia)
 Liberation of the remaining inmates of Auschwitz-related observances:
 Holocaust Memorial Day (UK)
 Holocaust Remembrance Day (Sweden)
 International Holocaust Remembrance Day
 Memorial Day (Italy)
 Memorial Day for the Victims of the Holocaust and Prevention of Crimes against Humanity (Czech Republic)
 Memorial Day for the Victims of National Socialism (Germany)
 National Holocaust Memorial Day (Greece)
 Family Literacy Day (Canada)
 Feast of Saint Slava (Serbia)
 National Chocolate Cake Day (United States)
 Saint Devota's Day (Monaco)
 January 28
 Army Day (Armenia)
 Data Privacy Day (international observance)
 January 29
 Kansas Day (Kansas, United States)
 January 30
 Day of Azerbaijani customs (Azerbaijan)
 Day of Saudade (Brazil)
 Fred Korematsu Day (California, United States)
 Martyrdom of Mahatma Gandhi-related observances:
 Martyrs' Day (India)
 School Day of Non-violence and Peace (Spain)
 Start of the Season for Nonviolence January 30 – April 4
 National Inane Answering Message Day (United States)
 Teacher's Day (Greece)
 January 31
 Amartithi (Meherabad, India, followers of Meher Baba)
 Independence Day (Nauru)
 Me-Dam-Me-Phi (Ahom people)
 Street Children's Day (Austria)

References 

 
01